Gambeya gorungosana is species of evergreen tree native to eastern and central Africa.

Range and habitat
Gambeya gorungosana ranges across eastern and central Africa, from Mozambique and Zimbabwe through Zambia, Malawi, Tanzania, Burundi, Rwanda, and eastern Democratic Republic of the Congo to Uganda and Kenya, and in Angola, Gabon, and Cameroon.

It is a characteristic tree in the Afromontane rain forests of the tropical African highlands, generally found on higher-rainfall slopes between 1200 and 2500 meters elevation.

References

Chrysophylloideae
Afromontane flora
Plants described in 1988